Luan Zhengrong (born 7 April 1974) is a Chinese cross-country skier. She competed at the 1998 Winter Olympics and the 2002 Winter Olympics.

References

External links
 

1974 births
Living people
Chinese female cross-country skiers
Olympic cross-country skiers of China
Cross-country skiers at the 1998 Winter Olympics
Cross-country skiers at the 2002 Winter Olympics
Sportspeople from Jilin
Asian Games medalists in cross-country skiing
Cross-country skiers at the 1996 Asian Winter Games
Cross-country skiers at the 1999 Asian Winter Games
Cross-country skiers at the 2003 Asian Winter Games
Asian Games gold medalists for China
Asian Games bronze medalists for China
Medalists at the 1996 Asian Winter Games
Medalists at the 1999 Asian Winter Games
Medalists at the 2003 Asian Winter Games
Skiers from Jilin